Pertti Laine (13 December 1938 – 20 October 1999) was a Finnish rower. He competed in the men's coxless four event at the 1960 Summer Olympics.

References

1938 births
1999 deaths
Finnish male rowers
Olympic rowers of Finland
Rowers at the 1960 Summer Olympics
Sportspeople from Turku